Gore is the debut album by Lous and the Yakuza. It was released on 16 October 2020 by Columbia Records.

Track listing
"Dilemme" – 3:07
"Bon acteur" – 2:19
"Telephone sonne" – 3:05
"Dans la hess" – 2:49
"Tout est gore" – 3:01
"Amigo" – 2:36
"Messes basses" – 3:14
"Courant d'air" – 2:49
"Quatre heures du matin" – 3:02
"Solo" – 3:13

Charts

References

2020 debut albums
Albums produced by el Guincho
French-language albums